The 1996 United States Senate elections were held on November 5, with the 33 seats of Class 2 contested in regular elections. Special elections were also held to fill vacancies. They coincided with the presidential election of the same year, in which Democrat Bill Clinton was re-elected president.

Despite the re-election of Clinton and Gore, and despite Democrats picking up a net two seats in the elections to the United States House of Representatives held the same day, the Republicans had a net gain of two seats in the Senate, following major Republican gains two years previously in the 1994 elections.  As such, Clinton became the first president re-elected since Theodore Roosevelt in 1904 to win either of his terms without any Senate coattails.

The Republicans won open seats previously held by Democrats in Alabama, Arkansas, and Nebraska. The only Democratic pickup occurred in South Dakota, where Democrat Tim Johnson narrowly defeated incumbent Republican Larry Pressler. The cycle featured an unusually high number of retirements, with thirteen in total. Additionally, special elections occurred as a result of early resignations by Republicans Bob Packwood and presidential nominee Bob Dole, the Senate majority leader.

Results summary 

Does not include Oregon's January 1996 special election. Includes Kansas's special election for the Class III seat vacated by Bob Dole.

Sources:
 Party Division in the Senate, 1789–Present, via Senate.gov
 Clerk of the U.S. House of Representatives:

Gains, losses, and holds

Retirements
Five Republicans and eight Democrats retired instead of seeking re-election.

Defeats
One Republican sought re-election but lost in the general election. One Republican also sought election to finish the unexpired term but lost in the primary.

Change in composition

Before the November elections 
After the January 1996 special election in Oregon.

After the November elections

Summary of contests

Special elections during the 104th Congress 

In these special elections, the winner was seated in the fall of 1996 (excluding Oregon), once they qualified and their elections were certified. Sorted by election date, then state, then class.

Elections leading to the next Congress 
In these general elections, the winners were elected for the term beginning January 3, 1997; ordered by state.

All of the elections involved the Class 2 seats.

Closest races 
Sixteen November races, as well as the Oregon special election in January, had margins less than 10%:

Alabama 

Incumbent Democrat Howell Heflin decided to retire. Republican and future Attorney General of the United States Jeff Sessions won the open seat, becoming only the second Republican U.S. Senator elected to represent Alabama since Reconstruction. This seat would remain controlled by Republicans until the election of Doug Jones in 2017.

In the 1968 presidential election, Alabama supported American Independent Party candidate George Wallace over both Richard Nixon and Hubert Humphrey. Wallace was the official Democratic candidate in Alabama, while Humphrey was listed as the "National Democratic". In 1976, Democratic candidate Jimmy Carter from Georgia carried the state, the region, and the nation, but Democratic control of the region slipped after that.

Since 1980, conservative Alabama voters have increasingly voted for Republican candidates at the Federal level, especially in Presidential elections. By contrast, Democratic candidates have been elected to many state-level offices and, until 2010, comprised a longstanding majority in the Alabama Legislature.

Roger Bedford won the Democratic primary over Glen Browder. Sessions won the Republican primary over Sid McDonald and Charles Woods, defeating McDonald in the runoff. Sessions then defeated Bedford by a seven point margin.

Alaska 

Incumbent Republican Ted Stevens ran for re-election to a sixth term. He defeated Republican Dave W. Cuddy in the open primary.

In the general election, Stevens faced off against Democratic nominee Theresa Obermeyer, a former member of the Anchorage School Board, and Green Party nominee Jed Whittaker, a commercial fisherman.

The race drew national attention for Obermeyer's erratic behavior: she blamed Stevens for her husband's failure to pass the bar exam and contended that he had passed the bar by fraud. She "trailed" him to campaign events, frequently wearing a prisoner's outfit and once dragging a ball and chain behind her. During the campaign, she was arrested and served 30 days in prison in California and Oregon for probation violations.

Stevens was re-elected in an overwhelming landslide and Whittaker finished ahead of Obermeyer.

Arkansas 

Incumbent Democrat David Pryor decided to retire. Republican Tim Hutchinson ran unopposed in the Republican primary. Arkansas Attorney General Winston Bryant defeated State Senator Lu Hardin narrowly in the Democratic primary runoff. Hutchinson narrowly prevailed in the general election despite Bill Clinton's victory in the state, winning the open seat.

Colorado 

Incumbent Republican Hank Brown decided to retire instead of seeking a second term. Republican Congressman Wayne Allard won the open seat after defeating Gale Norton in the primary, beating Democrat Tom Strickland, attorney and former U.S. Attorney for the District of Colorado, who himself had defeated Gene Nichol in the Democratic primary.

Delaware 

Incumbent Democrat Joe Biden won re-election to a fifth term, beating Republican businessman Raymond Clatworthy, who claimed the Republican nomination in a landslide.

Georgia 

Incumbent Democrat Sam Nunn decided to retire instead of seeking a fifth term. Republicans nominated Guy Millner, a multi-millionaire businessman who was also the unsuccessful candidate who ran against Zell Miller in the 1994 gubernatorial election. Millner emerged as the victor from a crowded 6-person primary in July 1996, which included State Senator Clint Day and former gubernatorial candidate Johnny Isakson. However, Max Cleland, the Secretary of State of Georgia ran unopposed in the Democratic primary.

Despite being held by Democrats since 1852, the election for this seat became tightly contested between Cleland and Millner. It was the closest race for that seat since at least 1852. Nonetheless, Max Cleland defeated Guy Millner on November 5. Max Cleland narrowly edged out a victory with 1,103,993 votes (48.87%) to Guy Millner's 1,073,969 votes (47.54%) – a margin of 1.33%.

The Class 2 United States Senate seat had been reliably Democratic, with a member of that party holding it since 1852. Additionally, no Republican had ever held at seat since it was established in 1789. In fact, during the previous election, Sam Nunn was unanimously re-elected and defeated Mike Hicks by an almost 60% margin in 1984. Republican Paul Coverdell narrowly unseated Democrat Wyche Fowler in Georgia's other United States Senate seat in 1992. On October 9, 1995, 4-term incumbent Class 2 Senator Sam Nunn announced his retirement. This left the seat open for the first time since 1972.

After the retirement of Sam Nunn, Democrats began seeking a successor for him. Eventually, Secretary of State of Georgia Max Cleland entered the race. Cleland was the only Democratic candidate to file for election, thus he became the nominee by default on July 9, 1996. During the primary, he received 517,697 votes – 100%.

Republicans also saw opportunity with an open Senate seat in Georgia. Six candidates filled to enter the Primary Election and become the Republican Nominee after July 9, 1996.

After the Republican Primary, Guy Millner emerged as the nominee. Charles Bullock, a political scientist at the University of Georgia, noted that defeated rival Johnny Isakson was more likely to win the moderate vote due to his pro-abortion rights views on abortion. Several polls earlier that year showed Cleland defeating both Millner and Isakson. In contrast to Isakson's opinion, Guy Millner was opposed to abortion except in the case of rape, incest, or to save the life of the mother. Johnny Isakson was later elected United States Senator after Zell Miller retired from his seat in 2004. Opponent Max Cleland quickly labeled Millner as an extremist, saying that "I think people in this state want to elect a moderate ... not an extremist, not an ideologue, and not somebody hung up on some ideological agenda." In response, Millner began campaigning on other issues to capture more moderate voters.

On Election Day, Democratic nominee Max Cleland narrowly won against Republican Guy Millner. It was one of the closest United States Senate Elections in the history of Georgia. Cleland received 1,103,993 votes to Millner's 1,073,969 votes. Libertarian candidate Jack Cashin obtained 81,262 votes, while only 8 people voted for Independent Arlene Rubinstein.

Idaho 

Incumbent Larry Craig won re-election against Democrat Walt Minnick, businessman and former Nixon Administration official, in a landslide.

Illinois 

Incumbent Democrat Paul Simon opted to retire rather than seek a third term. In the Democratic primary, Congressman Dick Durbin emerged victorious over future governor Pat Quinn, while State Representative Al Salvi won the Republican primary in an upset over incumbent Lieutenant Governor Bob Kustra. Though the election was initially anticipated to be close, Durbin defeated Salvi by a comfortable 15-point margin of victory, allowing him to win what would be the first of several terms in the Senate.

Iowa 

Incumbent Democrat Tom Harkin sought re-election to a third term unopposed in the Democratic primary, and he was challenged by Congressman Jim Ross Lightfoot from Iowa's 3rd congressional district, who won the Republican primary over Maggie Tinsman. Lightfoot had won the Republican primary against two opponents, while Harkin had won his primary uncontested, so both moved on to the general election, where they engaged in a toughly-fought campaign. Ultimately, Harkin was successful in his bid, and defeated Lightfoot, albeit by the thinnest margin of his career — 5.1 points.

Kansas 

Due to the resignation of Bob Dole campaigning for the Presidential election, there were two elections in Kansas as both seats were up for election.

Kansas (regular) 

Incumbent Republican Nancy Kassebaum decided to retire instead of seeking a fourth term. Republican Pat Roberts won the open seat, beating the Democratic Kansas State Treasurer Sally Thompson. Thompson faced no primary opposition, while Roberts faced token opposition.

Term limits were an issue during the campaign; while Roberts said that he was not totally opposed to term limits, he was wary of limits that did not apply to current members of Congress, saying that the proposed limits should apply to everyone. While Thompson signed the national term limits pledge from the group Americans for Limited Terms, Roberts declined to do so, becoming the only major party candidate for the U.S. Senate in the 1996 elections to not sign the pledge. However, he did say that "I plan only to serve two terms in the U.S. Senate." In 2014, he was elected to a fourth term in office.

Kansas (special) 

Incumbent Republican Sheila Frahm, who was recently appointed to the seat, was defeated in the primary by Sam Brownback, who went on to win the general election by ten points over Jill Docking, businesswoman and daughter-in-law of former Kansas Governor Robert Docking, who herself had defeated Joan Finney in the Democratic primary. Brownback would remain in office until 2011, when he resigned his seat to run for Governor of Kansas in 2010, which he eventually won.

Kentucky 

Incumbent Republican Mitch McConnell won re-nomination over Tommy Klein and then won re-election to a third term with a 12.6% margin of victory over Steve Beshear, a former Lieutenant Governor, who had defeated Tom Barlow in the Democratic primary. McConnell's landslide victory occurred at the same time President Bill Clinton was re-elected to a second term, winning by a 7.5% margin nationwide, but carrying Kentucky by a 0.9% margin.

In 1996, Beshear started out trailing against McConnell, with an early general election poll placing McConnell ahead of Beshear 50% to 32%. The campaign ultimately became quite harsh, with the McConnell campaign sending "Hunt Man," a take off of Chicken George dressed in "the red velvet coat, jodhpurs, black riding boots and black helmet of a patrician fox hunter." This was done as a means of criticizing Beshear's membership in a fox hunting club in Lexington, and undercut the Beshear campaign's message that McConnell was a Republican in the mold of Newt Gingrich and that Beshear was the only friend of the working class in the race. Beshear did not make much traction with the electorate during the campaign. By October 1996, Beshear had narrowed the gap between himself and McConnell slightly, with McConnell leading Beshear 50% to 38%. Beshear was later elected governor in 2007.

Louisiana 

Incumbent Democrat J. Bennett Johnston chose to retire. After the jungle primary election, state treasurer Mary Landrieu went into a runoff election with State Representative Woody Jenkins of Baton Rouge, a former Democrat who had turned Republican two years earlier. She prevailed by 5,788 votes out of 1.7 million cast, the narrowest national result of the thirty-three races for the U.S. Senate that year and one of the closest election margins in Louisiana history. At the same time, Democrat Bill Clinton carried Louisiana by a considerable margin of 927,837 votes to 712,586 cast for Republican Bob Dole.

The multi-candidate field for the primary included Democratic state Attorney General Richard Ieyoub and the former Ku Klux Klan leader, David Duke, running again as a Republican. Among the minor candidates was Peggy Wilson, an at-large member of the New Orleans City Council, and Troyce Guice, who had sought the same seat thirty years earlier when it was held by the veteran Senator Allen J. Ellender.

Jenkins refused to concede and charged massive election fraud, orchestrated by the Democratic political organization of New Orleans, provided Landrieu's narrow margin of victory. He took his case to the Republican-controlled U.S. Senate and petitioned for Landrieu's unseating pending a new election. In a hearing, carried live by C-SPAN, the Senate Rules Committee in a party-line 8–7 vote agreed to investigate the charges. The decision briefly placed Landrieu's status in the U.S. Senate under a cloud.

Only a month into the probe, however, it emerged that Thomas "Papa Bear" Miller, a detective hired by Jenkins to investigate claims of fraud, had coached witnesses to claim they had participated in election fraud.  Three witnesses claimed Miller had paid them to claim that they had either cast multiple votes for Landrieu or drove vans of illegal voters across town.  The others told such bizarre tales that FBI agents dismissed their claims out of hand.  It also emerged that Miller had several felony convictions on his record, including a guilty plea to attempted murder.  The Democrats walked out of the probe in protest, but the probe continued.

The investigation dragged on for over ten months, angering the Democrats and exacerbating partisan friction in the day-to-day sessions of the Senate Agriculture, Nutrition and Forestry Committee to which Landrieu was assigned as a freshman member of the 105th Congress. Finally, in October 1997, the Rules Committee concluded that while there were major electoral irregularities, none of them were serious enough to burden Louisiana with a new election at that stage.  It recommended that the results stand.

The Landrieu-Jenkins contest was not the only U.S. Senate election in 20th century Louisiana in which the results were hotly disputed. Future Senator John H. Overton claimed the renomination and hence reelection of Senator Joseph E. Ransdell was tainted by fraud. In 1932, Senator Edwin S. Broussard claimed that his primary defeat by Overton was fraudulent. In both cases, the Senate seated the certified winners, Ransdell and Overton, respectively.

Maine 

Incumbent Republican William Cohen decided to retire instead of seeking a fourth term. To replace him, Congressman and former Governor of Maine Joseph E. Brennan won the Democratic primary over Sean Faircloth and Richard A. Spencer, while political consultant and 1994 nominee for Governor of Maine Susan Collins won the Republican primary over W. John Hathaway. A competitive general election ensued, but Collins ultimately won out over Brennan, keeping the seat in the Republican column.  With Collins's election to the Senate in 1996, Maine became only the second state after California to have two sitting women senators.

Massachusetts 

Incumbent Democrat John Kerry won re-election to a third term over the Republican Governor of Massachusetts,

On November 29, 1995, Governor Bill Weld announced his candidacy for the Senate seat occupied by U.S. Senator Kerry with a formal announcement on March 27, 1996. Kerry's previous two opponents in 1984 and 1990 had no prior elected office experience. The election was one of many competitive senate elections in 1996.

At the federal level, Democrats controlled both U.S. Senate seats and eight of ten U.S. House seats. No Republican won a senate election since 1972. In the 1984 presidential election, President Ronald Reagan won 49 of 50 states, with Massachusetts being his worst performance (excluding Walter Mondale's home-state of Minnesota. Reagan carried the state with just 51% of the vote. In 1994, incumbent Democrat Ted Kennedy won re-election against businessman Mitt Romney with just 58% of the vote, the lowest percentage since his first senate election campaign in 1962.

The first debate between Weld and Kerry was held in Faneuil Hall on April 8 with a second debate held on June 3. A third debate was held at the Emerson Majestic Theater on July 2. The Weld and Kerry campaigns agreed to eight debates and a spending cap of $6.9 million negotiated at Senator Kerry's Beacon Hill home on August 7; Senator Kerry later mortgaged his house to raise funds in October. On the same day the spending cap was agreed upon, Governor Weld jumped into the Charles River. He later spoke at the 1996 Republican National Convention on August 14 before debating U.S. Senator Kerry again on August 19. Senator Kerry spoke at the 1996 Democratic National Convention and debated Governor Weld again on September 16.

Michigan 

Incumbent Democrat Carl Levin won re-election to a fourth term over Ronna Romney radio talk show host and former daughter-in-law of Michigan governor George W. Romney. Both ran unopposed in the primary.

Minnesota 

Incumbent Democrat Paul Wellstone won re-nomination in a landslide, and he faced Republican Rudy Boschwitz, who had also handily won the Republican nomination in the general election. Wellstone won re-election to a second term with a majority, though he would die before his term expired.

Boschwitz filed to run a rematch against Wellstone. The incumbent was an unapologetic liberal. Rudy released ads accusing Wellstone of being "embarrassingly liberal" and calling him "Senator Welfare". Boschwitz accused Wellstone of supporting flag burning, a move that some believe possibly backfired. Like the 1990 election, Wellstone had a massive grassroots campaign which inspired college students, poor people and minorities to get involved in politics for the very first time. Prior to that accusation, Boschwitz had significantly outspent Wellstone on campaign advertising and the race was closely contested, but Wellstone went on to beat Boschwitz by a nine-point margin in a three-way race (Dean Barkley received 7%). Despite losing here, Barkley was later appointed near the end of the next term after Wellstone's 2002 death.

Mississippi 

Incumbent Republican Thad Cochran won re-election to a fourth term, unopposed in the Republican primary, by a landslide over Democrat Bootie Hunt, who defeated Shawn O'Hara in the Democratic primary.

Montana 

Incumbent Democrat Max Baucus, who was first elected in 1978 and was re-elected in 1984 and 1990, ran for re-election. He was unopposed in the Democratic primary, and moved on to the general election, where he faced a stiff challenge in Denny Rehberg, the Lieutenant Governor of Montana and the Republican nominee, who had faced nominal opposition. Despite Bob Dole's victory over Bill Clinton and Ross Perot in the state that year in the presidential election, Baucus managed to narrowly win re-election over Rehberg to secure a fourth term in the Senate by just under five percent. Shaw and Heaton's totals were greater than Baucus's margin of victory over Rehberg. This was the closest election of Baucus's senate career, having won every other election by at least ten points.

Nebraska 

Incumbent Democrat J. James Exon decided to retire instead of seeking a fourth term. Republican businessman Chuck Hagel won the Republican primary over Nebraska Attorney General Don Stenberg. Ben Nelson, Governor of Nebraska, was unopposed in the Democratic primary. Hagel won the open seat by 14 points over Nelson. Nelson would later serve alongside Hagel, being elected to the U.S. Senate in 2000.

New Hampshire 

Incumbent Republican Bob Smith won re-election to a second term over Democrat Richard Swett. Both were unopposed in their respective primaries. Smith had established himself as the most conservative Senator from the Northeast, and Bill Clinton's coattails nearly caused his defeat. On the night of the election many American media networks incorrectly projected that Swett had won. Smith would lose re-nomination to John Sununu in 2002 after briefly leaving the Republican party, and Sununu would succeed him in the Senate.

New Jersey 

Incumbent Democrat Bill Bradley decided to retire instead of seeking a fourth term.  Democratic Congressman Robert G. Torricelli won the election, beating Republican Congressman Dick Zimmer.

Zimmer was the front-runner for the GOP nomination from the start, getting endorsements from Republican leaders across the state, including Gov. Christine Todd Whitman. Both DuHaime, an anti-abortion candidate, and LaRossa, a pro-gun candidate, attempted to portray Mr. Zimmer as too liberal for the party. But Zimmer treated the two challengers as if they did not exist.

Democratic U.S. Representative Robert Torricelli easily won his party primary unopposed. Republican U.S. Representative Dick Zimmer won his party's nomination easily. Torricelli defeated Zimmer in the general election by 10 points, a margin less than President Bill Clinton, who carried New Jersey by almost 18%. Independents made up 4.8% of the vote.

Like other Democratic candidates around the country, Torricelli tried to portray "Zig-Zag Zimmer" as a clone of House Speaker Newt Gingrich and flip flopping on his positions on issues like Medicare, gun control and an increase in the minimum wage during the campaign. Zimmer tried to cast his opponent as a tax-and-spend liberal with ethical flaws. Military morale was also a part of the campaign.

New Mexico 

Incumbent Republican Pete Domenici ran for re-election to a fifth term and faced no Republican opposition. Art Trujillo defeated Eric Treisman in the Democratic primary. Domenici defeated Trujilo in a landslide, 65%-30%.

North Carolina 

The election was a rematch of the 1990 election: between the Republican incumbent Jesse Helms and the Democratic nominee Harvey Gantt. Gantt won the Democratic primary over Charles Sanders. Helms was unopposed. Helms won re-election to a fifth and final term by a slightly wider margin than in 1990.

Jesse Helms won the Republican Party's nomination unopposed.

Oklahoma 

Incumbent Republican Jim Inhofe won re-election to his first full term over Democratic businessman James Boren. He improved upon his margin in 1994 in the special election for the remainder of Democrat David Boren's term. Both candidates were unopposed in the primary.

Oregon 

Oregon had two elections due to a resignation, one in January, and then a second in November.

Oregon (special) 

A special election was held on January 30, 1996 to fill the seat vacated by Republican Bob Packwood, who had resigned October 1, 1995 due to sexual misconduct allegations.

In the primaries held on December 5, 1995, Democratic U. S. Representative Ron Wyden and Republican President of the Oregon State Senate Gordon H. Smith were nominated. Wyden narrowly defeated fellow U.S. Representative Peter DeFazio in the Democratic primary, while Smith won by a large margin, with the next closest candidate being Norma Paulus. Wyden then defeated Smith in the general election by just over one percentage point. Smith would win the regularly-scheduled election to the Senate later that year and serve alongside Wyden until 2009, when he was succeeded by Democrat Jeff Merkley.

Oregon (regular) 

Incumbent Republican Mark Hatfield decided to retire after thirty years in the Senate. Oregon State Senate President Gordon H. Smith, who had run for the Senate earlier that year, won the Republican primary with nominal opposition, while businessman Tom Bruggere won a contested Democratic primary over Harry Lonsdale, who had run in two previous Senate elections and was the Democratic nominee in 1990. The contest between Smith and Bruggere was one of the toughest that year, but ultimately, Smith was able to keep the seat in the Republican column and defeated Bruggere by a four-point margin.

This was the second Senatorial race for Gordon Smith in 1996; he had previously lost to Ron Wyden in the special election to fill Bob Packwood's seat.

Both candidates spent heavily from their own resources. Bruggere won the Democratic nomination with $800,000 of his own money in the primary race, and was one of 134 candidates for the U.S. Congress to finance their own elections in excess of $50,000 in that cycle. Smith had already spent $2.5 million of his own money earlier that same year in an unsuccessful effort to defeat Democrat Ron Wyden in the 1996 special election to replace Bob Packwood, who had resigned.

Shortly after their respective primary victories, the rivals met for a highly publicized lunch, and agreed to run issue-oriented campaigns. However, in the final weeks of the campaign, Bruggere supporters ran advertisements alleging a pollution problem with Smith's frozen foods business, which the Smith campaign characterized as a breach of that agreement. A Boston Globe profile highlighted their similarities as corporate candidates with minimal political experience.

In the general election race, most Oregon daily newspapers endorsed Smith over Bruggere. The race was close, with neither side claiming victory for several days after the elections absentee ballots were tallied. After all votes were counted, Smith won by 4 percentage points. It was the last of the 1996 Senate elections to be determined; overall, the Republicans gained two seats in the Senate, increasing their majority from 53 to 55 seats.

Rhode Island 

Incumbent Democrat Claiborne Pell decided to retire. Incumbent U.S. Representative Jack Reed won the Democratic primary with little opposition, while state Treasurer Nancy Mayer won the Republican nomination. Reed defeated Mayer in a landslide, 63%-35%. Rhode Island has been reliably Democratic at the federal level since the 1930s, but Republicans still had success during the 1980s. In fact, Republican John Chafee won re-election just two years earlier in 1994 by a similar margin.

South Carolina 

Popular incumbent Republican Strom Thurmond won re-election against Democratic challenger Elliott Springs Close.

The South Carolina Democratic Party held their primary on June 11, 1996.  Elliott Springs Close, a 43-year-old political novice from Columbia, entered the Democratic primary and faced opposition from black photographer Cecil J. Williams. Close was a wealthy heir of a textile business, a brother-in-law of President Clinton's chief of staff Erskine Bowles, who styled himself as a fiscal conservative and a social moderate.  Even though he proclaimed himself as such, he took positions that would align himself with the liberal wing of the Democratic party.  Close would not have voted to balance the budget, he agreed with the Don't ask, don't tell policy of the military initiated by Clinton and he supported continuing welfare as a federal entitlement program.

The South Carolina Republican Party held their primary on June 11, 1996 and the contest pitted 93-year-old incumbent Senator Strom Thurmond against two relatively unknown candidates.  Secretary of State Jim Miles was the only Republican statewide official who had not endorsed Strom Thurmond and it was rumored that he was considering entering the primary.  Thurmond's press secretary, Mark Goodin, criticized Miles for not endorsing Thurmond and told those who contributed to Miles campaign fund that they were contributing to a contest against Thurmond, not the state's other Senator, Democrat Fritz Hollings.  Miles soon endorsed Thurmond which left Harold G. Worley, a state representative from Myrtle Beach, and Charlie Thompson, an educator from Charleston, as the only opponents to Thurmond's election.  Worley spent $600,000 of his own money and based his campaign almost solely on Thurmond's age.  He questioned Thurmond's mental ability to make decisions and whether he had the capacity to fill out a full term, which would put Thurmond at one-hundred years old.  Nevertheless, Thurmond cruised to a primary victory and Worley only carried Horry County.

The race between Thurmond and Close boiled down to whether Thurmond could retain the affection of voters who had re-elected him over and over or whether Close could convince the voters that Thurmond's age was an impediment to effective service for the state.  Thurmond therefore adopted a non-confrontational approach to the campaign.  He chose to not debate Close, not only because he had not debated an opponent since Olin D. Johnston in the 1950 Senate election, but also because it would only emphasize the 50-year age difference between the candidates.  Thurmond energetically traversed the state greeting the voters and pointed out to them that with his experience, he could more effectively serve the state than a political neophyte.

Close ran television advertisements that highlighted the age issue by declaring that although Thurmond had admirably served the state for over fifty years, it was time for someone new to represent South Carolina.  He poured almost a million dollars into his campaign, but his campaign never remained focused.  For instance, trying to not appear too wealthy, Close traded his fancy foreign car for a Cadillac.  He acquired a speeding ticket in the Cadillac and a newspaper criticized him for driving a luxury automobile.  Frustrated, Close then switched his Cadillac for a Buick.  Another instance of his jumbled campaign came when said that his family's textile factories did not lay off an employee during the Great Depression.  Yet a week after this statement, three mills were closed and 850 employees were out of work.

By the day of the election on November 5, polls had shown that the voters thought it was time for Thurmond to retire, but they did not want to throw him out of office.  Close spent almost a million dollars of his fortune to defeat Thurmond and his decision to raise a million dollars from outside sources was attacked by the Thurmond campaign of a lack of confidence by Close in his own campaign.  Thurmond spent a little more than $2.6 million on the race and was said to have "dodged the bullet" by The State reporter Lee Bandy after his victory. The campaign aides of Thurmond stated he could have been defeated had either former Governor Richard Riley or 5th district congressman John M. Spratt, Jr. run against him.

South Dakota 

Incumbent Republican Larry Pressler ran for re-election to a fourth term, but narrowly lost to Democratic nominee Tim Johnson by 9,000 votes.

Pressler and Johnson swapped leads in their own polls all year. The two candidates also swapped charges. Pressler said that Johnson was too liberal for the state, while Johnson contended that Pressler was beholden to the out-of-state interests that have fattened his campaign coffers.

Seeking a fourth term, Pressler noted his seniority; his close ties to his longtime Senate colleague, Republican presidential candidate Bob Dole; and, most emphatically, the power he wielded as the chairman of the Commerce, Science and Transportation Committee.

Yet the massive changes in telecommunications law that he shepherded through the Senate since becoming chairman last year proved to be a mixed blessing politically for Pressler.

Political action committees related to industries affected by the legislation were generous donors to his campaign, and Pressler assured South Dakota voters that, over the long run, the bill will lower prices and provide jobs. But both telephone and cable television rates had gone up in South Dakota that year, leading Pressler to pull an ad stating that phone rates were going down.

Despite this apparently negative short-term effect, Pressler said that Johnson's votes against the "telecom" bill, along with his opposition to the GOP's seven-year balanced-budget plan and changes in farm policy, proved Johnson votes inconsistently with his moderate rhetoric.

"You say one thing in South Dakota and vote liberal all the time in Washington," intoned an announcer in a Pressler TV ad. In another ad, which Pressler called "the essence of my campaign," the senator himself called Johnson a liberal.

Johnson countered that Pressler's vote for the deficit- reducing budget-reconciliation package was a blow against the interests of farmers and seniors, two groups that helped fuel Pressler's victories in the past. Johnson also warned that farmers will be more vulnerable in years of poor yield under the new farm law. The so-called Freedom To Farm Act received mixed reviews from major agriculture groups in the state. The results were 51% for Johnson and 49% for Pressler.

Tennessee 

Republican Senator Fred Thompson ran for re-election to a second term.  Thompson defeated the Democratic challenger, Covington lawyer Houston Gordon in the general election.

Texas 

Incumbent Republican Phil Gramm won re-election to a third term over Democratic Navy veteran Victor Morales.

Gramm was easily renominated in the Republican primary. Morales, who never ran for public office before, pulled a major upset in the primary by defeated three politicians: U.S. Congressman John Wiley Bryant, U.S. Congressman Jim Chapman, and former State Supreme Court litigator John Odam. In the March run-off, he defeated Bryant with 51% of the vote. He became the first minority in Texas history to become a United States Senate nominee from either major party. Despite having no staff, raising only $15,000, and not accepting any special interest money he obtained 2.5 million votes.

Gramm previously ran for President earlier in the year, but lost to fellow U.S. Senator Bob Dole in the Republican presidential primary. Gramm was the heavy favorite. A September poll showed Gramm leading 50% to 40%. A late October poll showed him leading with 53% to 31%.

Exit Polls showed that Gramm performed well with Anglos (68% to 31%), while Morales won African Americans (79% to 19%) and Latinos (79% to 20%) respectively.

Virginia 

Incumbent Republican John Warner won re-election to a fourth term. Warner, a moderate Republican who held this Senate seat from 1979, remained a popular and powerful political figure. A former United States Secretary of the Navy, he was at this time Chairman of the Senate Rules Committee.

Warner easily won renomination over former OMB director James C. Miller III, despite opposition by a number of conservative Republicans, who distrusted him because of his moderate positions (Warner is pro-abortion rights, pro-gun control and refused to support 1994 Senate nominee Oliver North due to his role in the Iran-Contra Affair).

Warner was endorsed by such notable figures as Bob Dole, George H. W. Bush, and Colin Powell, while Miller was endorsed by the NRA.

The two Warners (no relation) competed in one of the closest Senate elections in Virginia history. The incumbent, who was a moderate Republican, was very popular and didn't even have a major opponent in his last re-election bid in 1990. Although Mark Warner was relatively unknown, he became one of John Warner's strongest challengers. The Democrat self-financed his campaign and ended up outspending the Republican. In October, the Democrat outspent the incumbent 5-1.

The incumbent had to compete in a primary against James C. Miller III, who was more conservative, because he decided to endorse an independent in the 1994 U.S. Senate election, opting not to endorse the controversial Republican nominee, Oliver North. Despite this, North did endorse John Warner in the 1996 election. In the general election, the incumbent called the Democrat a "robber baron," "Carpetbagger," and a "Connecticut Yankee" who raised money from outside the state. Mark Warner tried to compete in the Southern part of the state, which is traditionally Republican territory. He earned the endorsement from the Reform Party of Virginia.

In June, the incumbent was leading 58%–24%. On September 19, the incumbent led 54%–34%.

Mark Warner lost the parts of the state that are outside the three largest metropolitan areas, 51%–49%, a very impressive result for a Democrat in this heavily Republican territory. However, John Warner's strength among moderates enabled him to carry Northern Virginia 55%–45%, which got him over the top. Warner would win election to the U.S. Senate in 2008, receiving John Warner's endorsement.

West Virginia 

Incumbent Democrat Jay Rockefeller won re-election to a third term victory over Betty Berks.

Incumbent Democrat Jay Rockefeller ran for re-election to a third term. He defeated Bruce Barilla, a Christian activist, in the Democratic primary by a wide margin. He faced Republican Betty A. Burks and won by a wide margin in the general election, 77%-23%. West Virginia, a longtime Democratic stronghold, began to shift red after Arch A. Moore Jr. was twice elected governor. Though Bush started a Republican winning streak at the presidential level in 2000, Rockefeller never faced a competitive re-election campaign in his tenure.

Wyoming 

Incumbent Republican Alan K. Simpson decided to retire. Democrat Kathy Karpan, Wyoming Secretary of State, won the Democratic primary over Mickey Kalinay. Wyoming State Senator Mike Enzi won the Republican primary over John Barrasso and Curt Meier. Barrasso was later appointed to the U.S. Senate after the death of Craig L. Thomas and re-elected in his own right three times.

Enzi defeated Karpan by 12 points in the general election. Wyoming is one of the most Republican states in the country, and Enzi's re-election margin was similar to Bob Dole's 13-point margin over incumbent U.S. President Bill Clinton in the state.

Notes

See also 
 1996 United States elections
 1996 United States gubernatorial elections
 1996 United States presidential election
 1996 United States House of Representatives elections
 104th United States Congress
 105th United States Congress

References

External links 
 Kerry-Weld debates of 1996
 "The Good Fight" by James Carney
 Kranish, Michael, Brian C. Mooney, and Nina J. Easton. John F. Kerry: The Complete Biography by the Boston Globe Reporters Who Know Him Best, PublicAffairs, 2004. .